The Gordon–Schaust Site (Smithsonian trinomial 21CW83) is a prehistoric Native American archaeological site in Crosslake, Minnesota, United States.  It comprises two separate but nearly parallel groups of linear mounds, undated but well preserved.  The site was listed on the National Register of Historic Places in 1974 for having state-level significance in the theme of archaeology.

Archaeological history
The main series of mounds was first documented by Jacob V. Brower during archaeological surveys in 1897 and 1901.  He dubbed them the Gordon Embankments.  The Minnesota Historical Society sponsored a new survey in 1972, which revealed a second series of mounds a short distance away and nearly parallel to the first.  These were designated the Schaust Embankments.

Description
The Gordon Embankments consist of 20 mounds, all but one of them linear. Four lie on a north–south axis, while the rest trend somewhat to the northwest.

Both embankments comprise a series of linear mounds lying mostly end to end.  This contrasts with two other mound groups in the area: the Upper Hay Lake Mounds lie in parallel rows, while the Fort Flatmouth Mounds form a rough enclosure.

See also
 National Register of Historic Places listings in Crow Wing County, Minnesota

References

Archaeological sites on the National Register of Historic Places in Minnesota
Geography of Crow Wing County, Minnesota
Historic districts on the National Register of Historic Places in Minnesota
Mounds in Minnesota
National Register of Historic Places in Crow Wing County, Minnesota